Bakulino is the name of several rural localities in Russia:
Bakulino, Moscow Oblast, a village in Poretskoye Rural Settlement of Mozhaysky District in Moscow Oblast; 
Bakulino, Vologda Oblast, a village in Nesterovsky Selsoviet of Sokolsky District in Vologda Oblast